Khoja Marjanli Mosque is a mosque located in Shusha, a city in Nagorno-Karabakh, currently under Azerbaijani control. It is located on Mirza Alakbar Sabir street of Khoja Marjanli neighborhood of Shusha, about 350 km from capital Baku It was part of the Nagorno-Karabakh Autonomous Oblast, and came under control of local Armenian forces on May 8, 1992. On 8 November 2020, Azerbaijani forces retook the city during the 2020 Nagorno-Karabakh War following a three-day long battle.

See also 
 Khoja Marjanly's Spring
 Caravansary of Safarov brothers

References

External links

Karabakh Monuments

Mosques in Shusha
18th-century mosques